A kontra is a Hungarian ('three-stringed viola'), Czech, Polish,
Romanian, Slovak and Romani instrument common in Transylvania.

Construction
The kontra can be constructed new, but is most often classical viola which has undergone several organological changes, for example, thinning ("regraduating") the top, back, and sides to increase the amplitude, and flattening the bridge, which allows the player to sound all three strings at once in order to produce chords. In addition, unlike the viola, they are only strung with three strings.

Tuning
The kontra is tuned like a viola, though lacking its low c string: g – d' – a' and frequently the a' string is replaced with a second g string tuned to a, a major second above the g, in a form of re-entrant tuning.

Technique
Due to the flattened bridge, the standard method of play is to play double stops and three-note chords and let the fiddle play melody lines.

Ensemble playing 
The kontra has a defined role within dance band music. Its range lies between that of the fiddle or Vioara cu goarnă on the high-end and the double bass on the low-end. Many Hungarian and Romanian bands also feature the cimbalom or citera, clarinet, accordion, and Ütőgardon or cello.

See also
Music of Hungary
Music of Romania
Music of Slovakia
Vioara cu goarnă

References

String instruments
Romanian musical instruments